Boys in the Trees is a 2016 Australian fantasy drama film directed by Nicholas Verso. It was screened in the Discovery section at the 2016 Toronto International Film Festival. The plot follows two boys who reconnect over their memories and fears as they walk through the woods on Halloween night, 1997.

Critical reception
Reviews were mixed but generally favourable, with a score of 78% on Rotten Tomatoes based on 15 reviews. The AV Club included it in its "The best films of 2017 that we didn't review" feature, noting that while its themes were not original, the film "grapples with the universal teenage themes of fitting in and growing apart more imaginatively—and sensitively—than most." The Guardian's reviewer gave it 2/5, finding some moments were "memorably surreal," but writing that it suffered from its low budget and lack of script editing.

Cast
 Toby Wallace as Corey
 Gulliver McGrath as Jonah
 Mitzi Ruhlmann as Romany
 Justin Holborow as Jango

References

External links
 

2016 films
2016 directorial debut films
2016 drama films
2010s fantasy drama films
2016 horror films
Australian horror drama films
Australian fantasy drama films
2010s English-language films
Films shot in Adelaide
Films set in 1997
Halloween horror films
2010s Australian films